Stan Smith (26 September 1932 – 26 January 2012) was an Australian rules footballer who played with South Melbourne in the Victorian Football League (VFL).

Smith made six appearances, as a half back flanker, in the 1951 VFL season. He went to play a total of 26 games in four season.

After South Melbourne relocated to Sydney in 1982 to become the Sydney Swans, Smith was a part of a group of former players who assisted in reuniting the old South Melbourne players with the Sydney club.

References

1932 births
Australian rules footballers from Victoria (Australia)
Sydney Swans players
2012 deaths